Sporolithon is a genus of red coralline algae in the family Sporolithaceae, in the order Corallinales.

Species
the World Register of Marine Species includes the following species in the genus:-

Sporolithon africanum (Foslie) J.Afonso-Carillo, 1986
Sporolithon australasicum (Foslie) N.Yamaguishi-Tomita ex M.J.Wynne, 1986
Sporolithon crassiramosum (Pilger) P.C.Silva, 1996
Sporolithon crassum Heydrich, 1897
Sporolithon durum (Foslie) R.A.Townsend & Woelkerling, 1995
Sporolithon elevatum M.C.Henriques & R.Riosmena-Rodriguez, 2014
Sporolithon episoredion (Adey, Townsend & Boykins) Verheij, 1992
Sporolithon episporum (M.A.Howe) E.Y.Dawson, 1960
Sporolithon erythraeum (Rothpletz) Kylin, 1956
Sporolithon howei (Lemoine) N.Yamaguishi-Tomita ex M.J.Wynne, 1986
Sporolithon indicum V.Krishnamurthy & Jayagopal, 1987
Sporolithon lemoinei (Weber-van Bosse) Verheij, 1993
Sporolithon liberum (M.Lemoine) J.Aguirre & J.C.Braga, 1998
Sporolithon mediterraneum Heydrich, 1899
Sporolithon mesophoticum J.Richards, P.W.Gabrielson & C.W.Schneider, 2018
Sporolithon molle (Heydrich) Heydrich, 1897
Sporolithon pacificum E.Y.Dawson, 1960
Sporolithon ptychoides Heydrich, 1897
Sporolithon schmidtii (Foslie) G.D.Gordon, Masaki & Akioka, 1976
Sporolithon sibogae (Weber-van Bosse & Foslie) P.C.Silva, 1987
Sporolithon stefaninii (Raineri) P.C.Silva, 1996
Sporolithon tenue R.G.Bahia, G.M.Amado-Filho, G.W.Maneveldt & W.H.Adey, 2013
Sporolithon timorense (Foslie) P.C.Silva, 1987

References

Red algae genera
Florideophyceae